Harvey Daniel James Elliott (born 4 April 2003) is an English professional footballer who plays as a central midfielder for  club Liverpool.

Having come up through their academy, Elliott made his first-team debut for Fulham in September 2018, becoming the youngest player to play in the EFL Cup, aged 15 years and 174 days.

Early life
Elliott was born in Chertsey, Surrey. He was interested in football from a young age and grew up supporting Liverpool. His father, Scott, would tutor him so he could develop a professional attitude towards training. Elliott joined Queens Park Rangers' youth academy at an early age.

Club career

Fulham
Elliott was signed by Fulham’s academy at U-18 level. He made his first-team debut for Fulham on 25 September 2018 as a 15-year-old in the EFL Cup Third round away to Millwall, as an 81st-minute substitute for Floyd Ayité in a 3–1 win. He had been at Coombe Boys' School in New Malden, Greater London earlier that day and was back at school the next morning. At 15 years and 174 days he became the club's youngest ever first-team player and the youngest to ever play in the competition.

On 4 May 2019, Elliott made his Premier League debut after coming on as a 88th-minute substitute for André-Frank Zambo Anguissa in a 1–0 away defeat to Wolverhampton Wanderers. In doing so, he became the youngest ever Premier League player at the time, at 16 years and 30 days, beating the then record set in 2007 by fellow Fulham player Matthew Briggs.

Liverpool

2019–20 season

Elliott signed for Premier League club Liverpool on 28 July 2019 for an undisclosed fee. He made his debut for the club on 25 September in that season's EFL Cup match against Milton Keynes Dons. At the age of 16 years and 174 days, he became the youngest-ever player to start a match for the club, and second-youngest to feature in a competitive fixture behind Jerome Sinclair. The following month, during the team's 5–4 penalty shoot-out (after a 5–5 draw after extra time) win over Arsenal in the next round of the competition, Elliott became the youngest player to start a match at Liverpool's home ground, Anfield, at the age of 16 years and 209 days. He made his Premier League debut for Liverpool on 2 January 2020, replacing Mohamed Salah one minute before the final whistle in a 2–0 home win against Sheffield United.

Elliott signed his first professional contract with Liverpool on 6 July 2020. On 10 February 2021, the independent Professional Football Compensation Committee ordered Liverpool to compensate Fulham an undisclosed amount for Elliott’s transfer. Liverpool confirmed the fee as £1.5 million, plus £2.8 million in bonuses. The fee was a record for a then-16 year old.

Loan to Blackburn Rovers
In October 2020, Elliott joined Championship club Blackburn Rovers on a season-long loan. He made his league debut for Blackburn in their 3–1 away loss to Watford on 21 October. He scored his first goal for the club in their 4–0 away win against Coventry City on 24 October.

In April 2021, Elliott was nominated for the EFL Young Player of the Season award, which was eventually won by Reading player Michael Olise. He finished the 2020–21 season with 7 goals and 11 assists. He also was awarded Blackburn's Goal of the Season for his strike against Millwall in December 2020. He returned to Liverpool after the Championship season ended in May 2021.

2021–22 season
Elliott signed a new long-term contract with Liverpool on 9 July 2021. He made his full Premier League debut for Liverpool on 21 August, starting and playing the whole match in a 2–0 win against Burnley. On 12 September, Elliott dislocated his ankle in a challenge with Leeds United defender Pascal Struijk in a 3–0 away league win. Following the injury, Liverpool confirmed that he would require surgery. On 14 September, Elliott underwent successful surgery in London, with the club remaining hopeful that he would make a return before the end of the 2021–22 season.

Elliott returned to the Liverpool squad on 6 February 2022 in a fourth round FA Cup match against Cardiff City, coming on as a substitute in the 58th minute and scoring his first Liverpool goal in a 3–1 Liverpool victory.

On 16 February 2022, he made his Champions League debut, being named in the starting line-up for a Round of 16 tie against Italian giants Inter Milan. He played 60 minutes before being replaced by Naby Keïta.

He came on in the 79th minute of the 2022 EFL Cup Final for captain Jordan Henderson and played the remaining minutes of the game, including the entirety of extra time. The game finished 0-0 and Elliott scored the 9th penalty for his side in the resulting shootout, which they won 11–10, to lift their first EFL Cup in 10 years.

2022–23 season
On 27 August 2022, he scored his first Premier League goal for Liverpool in the 9–0 win against AFC Bournemouth. He became a regular in the first team, deputising for Jordan Henderson in the Captain's absence, and won plaudits for his "exceptional" performance against Newcastle United. On 12 October 2022, he scored his first Champions League goal when he scored the rebound from Diogo Jota's deflected effort in a 7–1 win against Rangers, their heaviest ever European defeat and the first time they had conceded seven goals at Ibrox. He then scored his second Champions League goal just two weeks later, notching the third in a 3–0 away win over Ajax at the Johan Cruyff Arena to help Liverpool qualify for the knockout stage.

International career
Elliott received his first call-up to the England under-17 team in October 2018. The following month he scored his first goal at this age level, away to the Republic of Ireland.

Elliott was included in the England under-17 squad for the 2019 Syrenka Cup, a friendly tournament usually held in preparation for UEFA European Under-17 Championship qualifying. Elliott helped the England under-17 team to the title on 10 September 2019 by scoring the opening goal of the final from the spot in a 2–2 draw with hosts Poland before Kevin Betsy's Young Lions won 3–1 after a penalty shoot-out.

Elliott made his debut for the under-21 team on 25 March 2022 in a 4–1 win over Andorra at Dean Court in 2023 U21 EURO qualifying.

Personal life
He is a lifelong fan of Liverpool and attended the 2018 UEFA Champions League Final in Kyiv with his father, Scott. He is a close friend of Fábio Carvalho, having attended the same school and come through the Fulham academy together, later advising him to join Liverpool.

Elliott is a fan of the NBA, supporting the Boston Celtics, and has attended several of their games. He considers teammate Mohamed Salah to be a friend and mentor, with the forward taking him under his wing during the 2021–22 season and advising him on his diet and exercise plans.

Career statistics

Honours
Liverpool
EFL Cup: 2021–22
FA Community Shield: 2022
UEFA Super Cup: 2019
FIFA Club World Cup: 2019
UEFA Champions League runner-up: 2021–22

England U17
Syrenka Cup: 2019

Individual
Blackburn Rovers Goal of the Season: 2020–21

References

External links

Profile at the Liverpool F.C. website

2003 births
Living people
Sportspeople from Chertsey
Footballers from Surrey
English footballers
Association football midfielders
Association football wingers
Fulham F.C. players
Liverpool F.C. players
Blackburn Rovers F.C. players
Premier League players
English Football League players
England youth international footballers
England under-21 international footballers